HM Prison Bendigo was a medium security prison facility located in Bendigo, Victoria, Australia. Constructed in the early 1863, the prison officially closed in 2004, and has since been converted into Ulumbarra Theatre, one of the city's largest performing arts venues. Construction on the prison began in the late 1850s and was originally housed both male and female inmates before they were relocated in 1896.

Executions

Cited references

References 

1863 establishments in Australia
2006 disestablishments in Australia
Buildings and structures in Bendigo
Defunct prisons in Victoria (Australia)
Bendigo